HD 27894 is a 9th magnitude star located approximately 143 light years away in the constellation of Reticulum. It is an orange dwarf (spectral type K2V), a type dimmer and cooler than the Sun.

In 2005, the Geneva Extrasolar Planet Search Team announced the discovery of an extrasolar planet orbiting the star. In 2017, the discovery of two additional exoplanets was announced. One is very close to the star like the one discovered earlier, while the other one orbits the star at a much larger distance. It is the first system where such a large gap between orbital distances has been found. In 2022, the inclination and true mass of HD 27894 d were measured via astrometry. The study only found strong evidence for planets b and d.

See also
 List of extrasolar planets

References

External links

K-type main-sequence stars
027894
020277
Reticulum (constellation)
Planetary systems with three confirmed planets
Durchmusterung objects